Diploschizia habecki is a species of sedge moth in the genus Diploschizia. It was described by John B. Heppner in 1981. It is found from southern Georgia to central Florida.

The length of the forewings is 2.4-3.4 mm. The ground color of the forewings is dark fuscous with a bronze shine and brown buff overlaid scaling. The hindwings are fuscous. Adults are on wing from April to May and again from July to December.

The larvae feed on Rhynchospora corniculata. They bore the seeds of their host plant. A single larva consumes several seeds. Pupation takes place within a seed.

References

External links
 Diploschizia habecki at Zipcodezoo.com

Moths described in 1981
Glyphipterigidae